Gould's Book of Fish: A Novel in Twelve Fish is a 2001 novel by Tasmanian author Richard Flanagan. Gould's Book of Fish was Flanagan's third novel.

Plot summary
Gould's Book of Fish is a fictionalised account of the convict William Buelow Gould's life both at Macquarie Harbour and elsewhere during his life in Van Diemen's Land.

Chapter titles (the twelve fish)
The Pot-bellied Seahorse
The Kelpy
The Porcupine Fish
The Stargazer
The Leatherjacket
The Serpent Eel
The Sawtooth Shark
The Striped Cowfish
The Crested Weedfish
The Freshwater Crayfish
The Silver Dory
The Weedy Seadragon

Artwork
The novel is unusual in that it makes use of paintings by the real Van Diemonian convict artist William Buelow Gould reproduced with permission from William Gould's Sketchbook of Fishes, held by the Allport Library and Museum of Fine Arts, in the State Library of Tasmania. These images of fish are used both as chapter headings and inspiration for characters. Different editions around the world have used different images of Gould's for their cover.

Notes
Dedication: "For Rosie, Jean and Eliza, swimming in ever widening rings of wonder."
Epigraph: "My mother is a fish." – William Faulkner.

Awards
Commonwealth Writers Prize, South-East Asia and South Pacific Region, Best Book, 2002: winner 
Commonwealth Writers Prize, Overall Best Book Award, 2002: winner 
Miles Franklin Literary Award, 2002: shortlisted 
Victorian Premier's Literary Award, The Vance Palmer Prize for Fiction, 2002: winner 
Booksellers Choice Award, 2001: shortlisted 
Australian Literary Society Gold Medal, 2002

Reviews

The Christian Science Monitor: "Lowly fish battle Tasmanian devil", Ron Charles, 28 March 2002

The Guardian "In the hands of madmen", Alex Clark 1 June 2002

The Daily Telegraph  Will Cohu, Deep Down Under

New York Times  Michiko Kakutani, 'A Reborn Criminal Distils Beauty From a Prison's Abominable Depths'
The Observer "Con fishing", Robert MacFarlane, 26 May 2002
Australian Book Review   Brian Matthews, 'The Ministry of Fish'

References

2001 Australian novels
Western Tasmania
Novels by Richard Flanagan
Novels set in Tasmania
ALS Gold Medal winning works
Postmodern novels
Pan Books books